SBHC could refer to:
 School-Based Health Centers, a form of primary care clinic in the United States
 Sheffield Barbershop Harmony Club, a barbershop club based in Sheffield, England